Borys Romanovich Hmyria  ( (also Boris Romanovich Gmyrya); (August 1, 1969), PAU, was a Soviet-Ukrainian bass singer of opera and art song.

Biography

Hmyria was born in 1903 in Lebedin, Kharkov Governorate, Russian Empire (today part of Ukraine). He remained in Poltava during World War II where he performed for the Germans. This kind of behavior was considered collaboration with enemy by Soviet authorities. Hmyria would have been imprisoned and executed had it not been for Joseph Stalin's intervention. Hmyria's partner, Valentina Ishchenko, was exiled to Vorkuta in the Komi ASSR.

He died in Kiev in 1969.

Friendship with Shostakovich

Hmyria was a friend of Dmitri Shostakovich and often performed his Five Romances on Verses by Yevgeny Dolmatovsky in concert, although their friendship came under strain because of mutual perceived slights and their contrasting personalities.

During the summer of 1962, Shostakovich was completing his Thirteenth Symphony; the bass soloist part had been composed with Hmyria's voice in mind. The singer was reluctant to commit accepting the responsibility of singing the premiere performance, despite the composer's repeated urging. On August 15, Hmyria declined the assignment citing his objections to Yevtushenko's verses, but attended the premiere performance on December 18. After the concert, Hmyria wrote: "This evening I listened to Shostakovich's Thirteenth Symphony. My greatest impressions: 'Babi Yar,' 'In the Shop.'"

References

External links
 
 Biography and sound clips on cantabile-subito.de
 
 Vzyav by ya bandura (If I played the bandura) - folk song
 Divlyus' ya v nebo (I marvel at the heavens) 
 https://www.youtube.com/watch?v=sBAFOC8GNZE
 https://www.youtube.com/watch?v=MKUDGzpPtPU
 Ya Vas lyubil (I loved you) (Alexander Dargomyzhsky)

1903 births
1969 deaths
People from Lebedyn
People from Kharkov Governorate
Operatic basses
Ukrainian basses
20th-century Ukrainian male opera singers
Burials at Baikove Cemetery
Soviet musicians